Teresa Paiva is a Portuguese somnologist, neurologist, academic and author. She was head of neurology at the Hospital de Santa Maria in Lisbon and is clinical director of the Sleep Medicine Center in Lisbon.

Training
Teresa Paiva was born in the Portuguese capital of Lisbon in 1945. She graduated in medicine from the Faculty of Medicine of the University of Lisbon in 1969 and obtained a doctorate in neurology and neurophysiology from the same university in 1977, having done an internship at the "TNO Institute of Medical Physics" in Utrecht, Netherlands. Since then, her career has concentrated on diseases related to sleep. She is recognised by the Portuguese Medical Association as having competence in neurology and neurophysiology and in sleep medicine. In 2012 she was appointed a "European Somnologist" by the European Sleep Research Society.

Career
From 1970, Paiva worked in various capacities at the Hospital de Santa Maria in Lisbon, retiring in 2006 as head of neurology, having been in that position since 1994. In 1976 she set up and ran the hospital's headache clinic, the first such unit in Portugal. From 1980 she was head of the hospital's electroencephalography (EEG) unit and in 1987 she set up its sleep consultation unit, having previously been involved with sleep consultation at the Centro de Estudos Egas Moniz, part of the University of Lisbon medicine faculty, where she introduced polysomnography.

Paiva has been the clinical director of the Centro de Electroencefalografia e Neurofisiologia Clínica, more commonly known as the Sleep Medicine Center (CENC), in Lisbon since 1983. She continues to collaborate with the University of Lisbon, coordinating the master's course in sleep sciences from 2005 to 2012  She was an invited professor of the biomedical engineering course of the Instituto Superior Técnico of the university between 2003 and 2016 and continues to collaborate in the doctoral programme on environmental health. In her career she has coordinated 18 national or international scientific projects and six clinical trials.

Paiva was a founder of the Portuguese Sleep Association in 1993. She is a member of the board of the International Pediatric Sleep Association.  .

Publications
Paiva has authored or co-authored over 145 peer-reviewed articles and is editor or co-editor of 13 books and 70 book chapters. In addition to technical publications, she has also authored books on sleep that have a more general appeal.
Teresa Paiva. 2015. Bom Sono, Boa Vida (Good Sleep, Good Life) takes the view that it is possible and essential to sleep better and provides advice on how to achieve this. 
Teresa Paiva & Helena Rebelo Pinto (ill. Danuta Wojciechowska). 2014. Dormir é Bom, Dormir Faz Bem (Sleep is good, sleep makes you well) is a book aimed at young children. 
Teresa Paiva & Thomas Penzel. 2011. Centro de Medicina do Sono - Manual Prático (Sleep Medicine Center—Practical Manual) is designed to provide advice to medical practitioners and students.

References

External links
Television interview (in Portuguese)

1945 births
Living people
Portuguese neurologists
University of Lisbon alumni
Academic staff of the University of Lisbon
Portuguese women scientists